Metopoceras driss is a moth of the family Noctuidae. It is found in Morocco and has been found once in Spain.

External links
species info

Metopoceras